DZO is an abbreviation that may refer to:

 Depleted zinc oxide
 DZO, the IATA code for the Santa Bernardina International Airport

See also
 
 
 DZ (disambiguation)
 ZO (disambiguation)